The Brick House in Cazenovia, New York was built in 1865.  It was listed on the National Register of Historic Places in 1988.

The Brick House is a two-story Italianate farmhouse building.

It is part of the Cazenovia Town Multiple Resource area.

References

Houses on the National Register of Historic Places in New York (state)
Italianate architecture in New York (state)
Houses completed in 1865
Houses in Madison County, New York
National Register of Historic Places in Cazenovia, New York